It's All Goode is the first studio album by Michael Carr's comedy character Buddy Goode. It was officially released both digitally and on CD in stores on 7 November 2008. The album is the first appearance by Carr's comedy character, and features the single that launched his career in 2007, "Dutchy in the Morning".

On 18 January 2013, the album was re-released into select stores as a double pack with Goode's second album, The One and Only Buddy Goode.

Track listing

References

External links
Official website
iTunes edition

Buddy Goode albums
2008 debut albums